Grzegorz of Stawiszyn (1481–1540), was a Polish philosopher and theologian of the mid 16th century, Rector of the University of Krakow  in the years 1538–1540.

Grzegorz was born in Stawiszyn in 1481. He was an adherent of Nominalism, a metaphysical view in philosophy, revived in western Europe at the turn of the sixteenth century thanks to French philosopher Jacques Lefèvre d'Étaples (Faber Stapulensis). Once Nominalism reappeared in Kraków and began taking precedence over Thomism and Scotism, Grzegorz of Stawiszyn, a Kraków professor, published Jacques d'Étaples works including his commentaries to works by Aristotle, beginning in 1510. As rector, Grzegorz introduced first reforms toward leaving the scholasticism of Peter of Spain at the University of Krakow beginning 1538, and replacing it with the Renaissance Aristotelianism, including classes in logic based on Dialectics of Jan Caesarius. He died in Krakow.

References

 Wydawnictwo Naukowe PWN SA,  Grzegorz ze Stawiszyna
 Interia Encyklopedia,  FABER Stapulensis Jacobus

Polish Christian theologians
Academic staff of Jagiellonian University
1481 births
1540 deaths
16th-century Polish philosophers